Christian Fuchs is an Austrian social scientist. From 2013 until 2022 he was Professor of Social Media and Professor of Media, Communication & Society at the University of Westminster, where he also was the Director of the Communication and Media Research Institute (CAMRI). Since 2022, he is Professor of Media Systems and Media Organisation at Paderborn University in Germany. He also known for being the editor of the open access journal tripleC: Communications, Capitalism & Critique. The journal's website offers a wide range of critical studies within the debate of capitalism and communication. This academic open access journal publishes new articles, special issues, calls for papers, reviews, reflections, information on conferences and events, and other journal specific information. Fuchs is also the co-founder of the ICTs and Society-network which is a worldwide interdisciplinary network of researchers who study how society and digital media interact. He is the editor of the Open Access Book Series "Critical, Digital and Social Media Studies" published by the open access university publishing house University of Westminster Press that he helped establish in 2015.

Fuchs has been influential in the study of modern day social media. He himself uses YouTube and Vimeo to present analyses of the Internet and society. He also uses the social media platform Twitter, where he presents ideas on society, media, culture, politics and the internet.

From 2015 until 2017, Christian Fuchs was a member European Sociological Association's executive board, where he played a key role in organizing the 2017 ESA conference in Athens.

Fuchs' fields of expertise are social theory, critical theory, critical digital and social media research, Internet & society, the political economy of media and communications, information society theory.

In his 2014 book Social Media: A Critical Introduction, Fuchs expressed criticism towards media scholar Henry Jenkins and his 2007 book Convergence Culture, in which Jenkins explores participation in culture, for having excluded factors such as power and equality in his analysis and stated that Jenkins is a "cultural reductionist".

Books (Monographs)
Internet and Society. Social Theory in the Information Age (Routledge, 2008) 
 Practical Civil Virtues in Cyberspace: Towards the Utopian Identity of Civitas and Multitudo (Shaker, 2009)  (co-author Rainer E. Zimmermann)
Foundations of Critical Media and Information Studies (Routledge, 2011) 
Digital Labour and Karl Marx (Routledge 2014) 
Social Media: A Critical Introduction (Sage 2014, first edition) 
OccupyMedia! The Occupy Movement and Social Media in Crisis Capitalism (Zero Books, 2014) 
Culture and Economy in the Age of Social Media (Routledge, 2015) 
Reading Marx in the Information Age: A Media and Communication Studies Perspective on Capital Volume 1 (Routledge 2016) 
Critical Theory of Communication: New Readings of Lukács, Adorno, Marcuse Honneth and Habermas in the Age of the Internet (University of Westminster Press, 2016) 
Social Media: A Critical Introduction (Sage 2017, second edition) 
The Online Advertising Tax as the Foundation of a Public Service Internet (University of Westminster Press, 2018) 
Digital Demagogue: Authoritarian Capitalism in the Age of Trump and Twitter (Pluto Press, 2018) 
Rereading Marx in the Age of Digital Capitalism (Pluto Press, 2019) 
Nationalism on the Internet: Critical Theory and Ideology in the Age of Social Media and Fake News (Routledge, 2020) 
Marxism: Karl Marx’s Fifteen Key Concepts for Cultural & Communication Studies (Routledge, 2020) 
Communication and Capitalism: A Critical Theory (University of Westminster Press, 2020) 
Marxist Humanism and Communication Theory. Media, Communication and Society Volume One (Routledge, 2021) 
Social Media: A Critical Introduction (Sage, 2021, third edition) 
Foundations of Critical Theory. Media, Communication and Society Volume Two (Routledge, 2021) 
Communicating COVID-19. Everyday Life, Digital Capitalism, and Conspiracy Theories in Pandemic Times. SocietyNow Series (Emerald, 2021) 
Foundations of Critical Theory (Routledge, 2022) ISBN 978-1-032-05789-7
Digital Fascism (Routledge, 2022) ISBN 9781032187600
Digital Humanism (Emerald, 2022) ISBN 9781803824222
Digital Capitalism (Routledge, 2022) ISBN 978-1-032-11920-5
Digital Ethics (Routledge, 2023) ISBN 9781032246161
Digital Democracy and the Digital Public Sphere (Routledge, 2023) ISBN 9781032362724

Edited Books and Collected Volumes
 Christian Fuchs & Klaus Unterberger, editors. 2021. The Public Service Media and Public Service Internet Manifesto  (London: University of Westminster Press). DOI: https://doi.org/10.16997/book60 
 Christian Fuchs, ed. 2021. Engels@200: Friedrich Engels in the Age of Digital Capitalism. tripleC: Communication, Capitalism & Critique 19 (1): 1-194. Published open access: https://doi.org/10.31269/triplec.v19i1.1233 
 Christian Fuchs, ed. 2020. Communicative Socialism/Digital Socialism. tripleC: Communication, Capitalism & Critique 18 (1): 1-285. Published open access: https://doi.org/10.31269/triplec.v18i1.1149 
 Christian Fuchs and Lara Monticelli, eds. 2018. Karl Marx @ 200. Debating Capitalism & Perspectives for the Future of Radical Theory. tripleC: Communication, Capitalism & Critique 16 (2): 406-741. Published open access: https://doi.org/10.31269/triplec.v16i2.1040
 David Chandler and Christian Fuchs, eds. Digital Objects, Digital Subjects: Interdisciplinary Perspectives on Capitalism, Labour and Politics in the Age of Big Data (University of Westminster Press, 2019) 
 Jack Qiu and Christian Fuchs, eds. 2018. Ferments in the Field: The Past, Present and Future of Communication Studies (Special issue). Journal of Communication 68 (2): 219-451.
 Christian Fuchs and Vincent Mosco, eds. 2016. Marx and the Political Economy of the Media. Studies in Critical Social Sciences, Volume 79. Leiden: Brill.  (Paperback: 2017. Chicago, IL: Haymarket Books).
 Christian Fuchs and Vincent Mosco, eds. 2016. Marx in the Age of Digital Capitalism. Studies in Critical Social Sciences, Volume 80. Leiden: Brill.  (Paperback 2017. Chicago, IL: Haymarket Books).
 Eran Fisher and Christian Fuchs, eds. 2015. Reconsidering Value and Labour in the Digital Age. Basingstoke: Palgrave Macmillan. 
 Marisol Sandoval, Christian Fuchs, Jernej A. Prodnik, Sebastian Sevignani and Thomas Allmer, eds. 2014. Special Issue: Philosophers of the World Unite! Theorising Digital Labour and Virtual Work - Definitions, Dimensions and Forms. tripleC: Communication, Capitalism & Critique 12 (2): 464-801. Published open access: https://doi.org/10.31269/triplec.v12i2.631 
 Christian Fuchs and Marisol Sandoval, eds. 2014. Critique, Social Media and the Information Society. New York: Routledge. 
 Daniel Trottier and Christian Fuchs, eds. 2014. Social Media, Politics and the State: Protests, Revolutions, Riots, Crime and Policing in the Age of Facebook, Twitter and YouTube. New York: Routledge. 
 Christian Fuchs and Vincent Mosco, eds. 2012. Marx is Back – The Importance of Marxist Theory and Research for Critical Communication Studies Today. tripleC – Open Access Journal for a Global Sustainable Information Society 10 (2): 127-632. Published open access: https://doi.org/10.31269/triplec.v10i2.427 
 Christian Fuchs, Kees Boersma, Anders Albrechtslund, Marisol Sandoval, eds. 2012. Internet and Surveillance. The Challenges of Web 2.0 and Social Media. New York: Routledge. 
 Fuchs, Christian and Göran Bolin, eds. 2012. Critical Theory and Political Economy of the Internet @ Nordmedia 2011. tripleC – Open Access Journal for a Global Sustainable Information Society 10 (1): 30-91. Published open access: https://www.triple-c.at/index.php/tripleC/issue/view/24
 Margit Appel, Ronald Blaschke, Christian Fuchs, Manfred Füllsack and Luise Gubitzer, eds. 2006. Grundeinkommen – In Freiheit tätig sein (Guaranteed Basic Income – Activity in Freedom). Berlin: Avinus. 
 Vladimir Arshinov and Christian Fuchs, eds. 2003. Causality, Emergence, Self-Organisation. Moscow: NIA-Priroda. 
 Christiane Floyd, Christian Fuchs, Wolfgang Hofkirchner, eds. 2002. Stufen zur Informationsgesellschaft. Festschrift zum 65. Geburtstag von Klaus Fuchs-Kittowski (Steps Towards the Information Society: Festschrift for Klaus Fuchs-Kittowski on the Occasion of his 65th Birthday). Vienna: Peter Lang.

Articles 
 Christian Fuchs & Sebastian Sevignani, tripleC,  vol. 11, no 2, 2013, p. 237–29

External links

References

Austrian sociologists
Autonomism
Living people
Year of birth missing (living people)
Academics of the University of Westminster